Phos brigitteae is a species of sea snail, a marine gastropod mollusk in the family Nassariidae, the true whelks and the like.

Description

Distribution

References

 Stahlschmidt P. & Fraussen K. (2009) Antillophos brigitteae (Gastropoda: Buccinidae), a new species from the Philippines. Visaya 2 (5): 80-83.
 Dekkers A.M. & Dekker H. (2020). A new small Phos-like genus and species Microphos palogai (Gastropoda: Nassariidae: Photinae) from the Philippines. Gloria Maris. 59(3): 98-101.

External links

Nassariidae
Gastropods described in 2009